Anne Smith (born July 1, 1959) is an educational psychologist and a former professional tennis player from the United States.

Smith's highest women's doubles ranking was world No. 1 in 1980 and 1981. Her highest singles ranking was world No. 11 in 1980.

Major finals

Grand Slam finals

Doubles: 9 (5–4)

Mixed doubles: 5 (5–0)

Year-End Championships finals

Doubles: 1 (0–1)

WTA Tour finals

Singles 4 (0–4)

Doubles 69 (32–37)

Grand Slam performance timeline

Singles

Doubles

Mixed doubles

Note: The Australian Open was held twice in 1977, in January and December.

Education 
She received a Bachelor of Arts in psychology from Trinity University and a PhD. in educational psychology from The University of Texas.

Career 
Smith is a licensed psychologist in Texas and Massachusetts. She was director of the Learning Center at Dean College in Franklin, Massachusetts. She was the coach of the WTT Boston Lobsters team in 2005, 2006, and 2007.

Smith is the author of Grand Slam: Coach Your Mind to Win in Sports, Business & Life, with a foreword by Billie Jean King, and The MACH 4 Mental Training System: A Handbook for Athletes, Coaches and Parents.

On August 22, 2012, Smith appeared in an episode of Storage Wars: Texas where she appraised the value of a tennis racket restringing machine that had been won in an auction of a storage unit.

Honors and awards 

 Mary Lowdon Award (Texas) -1974–1977
 Maureen Connolly Brinker Sportsmanship Award (Memphis, Tennessee) -1976
 Most Promising Player award by Seventeen – 1976
 Winner Seventeen Magazine Tournament  of Champions – 1977
 Winner Maureen Connolly Brinker Outstanding Junior Girl Award (Philadelphia) -1977
 Enshrined into the Texas Sports Hall of Fame in 1993
 Mental Training Coach for Harvard University Women's Tennis Team – 2005–2006
 Inducted into the Trinity University Athletics Hall of Fame in 1999
 35-and-Over Wimbledon Doubles Champion in 1996 & 1997
 Appointed Member of the United States Tennis Association (USTA) Sport Science Committee 2001, 2002,2018,2019
 Coach of the WTT Boston Lobsters – 2005, 2006, 2007
 Received the International Tennis Hall of Fame Educational award - 2017

References

External links
 The Official Dr. Anne Smith Website
 
 
 

1959 births
Living people
American female tennis players
Australian Open (tennis) champions
French Open champions
Tennis players from Dallas
Trinity Tigers women's tennis players
US Open (tennis) champions
Wimbledon champions
Grand Slam (tennis) champions in women's doubles
Grand Slam (tennis) champions in mixed doubles
Grand Slam (tennis) champions in girls' singles
French Open junior champions